Season 5 of the American competitive reality television series Hell's Kitchen began airing on the Fox Network starting on January 29, 2009. The season concluded on May 14, 2009. Gordon Ramsay returned as head chef, as well as sous chefs Scott Leibfried and Gloria Felix and maître d' Jean-Philippe Susilovic.

Executive Chef Danny Veltri won the series and was awarded a sous chef position under Stephen Kalt at Italian restaurant Fornelletto at the Borgata in Atlantic City, New Jersey. Danny also received $250,000 in prize money from the show.

This season also set a high number of unusual eliminations; with one chef eliminated without nomination, two chefs leaving due to medical issues, and two chefs eliminated during service, in addition to the first time a chef was eliminated despite being on the winning team, which would become more prominent in later seasons.

Format

The first half of each episode consists of a team challenge, in which the winning side gets a reward of some sort of leisure activity, while the losing side has to clean up and prepare both kitchens, as well as some activity that is not so pleasant. Afterwards, the teams compete in executing a dinner service, during which Ramsay can impose additional punishments or kick chefs out of the kitchen. The losing team(s) nominates chefs to be considered for elimination. Ramsay can also nominate chefs, and ultimately sends a chef home. At six chefs left, the teams merge to one, and the chefs compete as individuals.

Staff
Gordon Ramsay returned as the head chef, sous chefs Scott Leibfried of blue team and Gloria Félix of the red team, and Maître d' Jean-Philippe Susilovic as well.

Contestants
16 chefs competed in season five, and were initially separated by gender.

Contestant progress
Each week, the best member (as determined by Ramsay) from the losing team during the latest service period is asked to nominate two of their teammates for elimination; one of these two is meant to be sent home by Ramsay. On some weeks, there is a variation in the nomination process, depending on the losing team's (or even winning team's) performance.

Episodes

Notes

References

External links
 Hell's Kitchen official Fox.com website by Fox Broadcasting Company

Hell's Kitchen (American TV series)
2009 American television seasons